Tombland is a historical mystery novel by British author C. J. Sansom. It is the seventh book in the Matthew Shardlake series, following 2014's Lamentation. Set in the summer of 1549, the story deals with the investigation of a murder in Norfolk. Matthew Shardlake is entrusted by Princess Elizabeth, later Elizabeth I, to investigate the murder of the wife of a distant relative of hers. During the course of the investigation Shardlake gets involved in Kett's Rebellion.

The title comes from the Tombland area of Norwich which is just situated outside Norwich Cathedral. Tombland's etymolgoy is Danish in origin meaning 'empty space' or 'open land', and in the 11th century the area was home to an Anglo-Scandinavian marketplace.

Reception
Critical reception for Tombland has been positive. Stephanie Merritt writing for The Guardian commented that the novel is 'more of a grand historical epic than a tightly packed whodunnit.' In a similar vein Andrew Taylor writing for The Spectator praised the book as 'a Tudor epic disguised as an historical crime novel.'

References

2018 British novels
British crime novels
Novels by C. J. Sansom
Novels set in the 1540s
British historical novels
Novels set in Norfolk
Macmillan Publishers books
Fiction set in 1549